Thomas Lane (1582 – 31 December 1652) was an English lawyer and politician who sat in the House of Commons variously between 1625 and 1648.

Career
Lane was educated at Clifford's Inn and was a bencher of the Inner Temple and lord of the manor of Greenford Parva.

In 1625 Lane was elected Member of Parliament for Wycombe and was re-elected in 1628. After an eleven-year period during which King Charles I ruled without parliaments, Lane was re-elected for Wycombe in April 1640 for the Short Parliament. He was re-elected in November 1640 to the Long Parliament and remained supporting the parliamentarian cause until ejected under Pride's Purge in 1648.

Early life and family

Lane was born in Hughenden, Buckinghamshire and baptised there on 2 January 1583. According to Heralds visitations, he was descended from the "Lane family of Thingdon and Orlingbury" in Northamptonshire.

He married twice but had no children. His second wife was Jane Duncombe, daughter of John Duncombe of East Claydon, Buckinghamshire.

Lane died at the age of 70 and a memorial exists in the church of Greenford Parva (or Perivale). His will was proved on 10 May 1653.

References

1582 births
1652 deaths
English MPs 1625
English MPs 1628–1629
English MPs 1640 (April)
English MPs 1640–1648
Members of the Inner Temple